Sadao Kikuchi (born 24 July 1933) is a Japanese ski jumper. He competed at the 1960 Winter Olympics and the 1964 Winter Olympics.

References

1933 births
Living people
Japanese male ski jumpers
Olympic ski jumpers of Japan
Ski jumpers at the 1960 Winter Olympics
Ski jumpers at the 1964 Winter Olympics
Sportspeople from Hokkaido